Privately owned public spaces (POPS) in New York City were introduced in a 1961 zoning resolution.  The city offers zoning concessions to commercial and residential developers in exchange for a variety of spaces accessible and usable for the public.  There are over 590 POPS at over 380 buildings in New York City and are found principally in Manhattan.  Spaces range from extended sidewalks to indoor atriums with seating and amenities.  International attention was brought to POPS during the Occupy Wall Street movement begun in 2011 in Zuccotti Park.

List
List of noteworthy spaces.

Manhattan

Downtown
 17 State Street
 125 Broad Street, 2 New York Plaza
 85 Broad Street, Oppenheimer Holdings
 55 Water Street
 77 Water Street
 32 Old Slip, Financial Square 
 111 Wall Street
 75 Wall Street, Barclays Bank
 88 Pine Street, Wall Street Plaza
 180 Maiden Lane
 200 Water Street
 59 Maiden Lane, Home Insurance Plaza
 10 Liberty Street
 60 Wall Street
 40 Broad Street
 17 Battery Place, Whitehall Building
 33 Maiden Lane, Two Federal Preserve Plaza
 55 Church Street, Millenium Hilton Hotel
 105 Duane Street, Tribeca Tower
 388 Greenwich Street
 LentSpace
 Zuccotti Park, One Liberty Plaza

West Side
 300 Mercer Street
 99 Jane Street
 650 West 42nd Street, River Place
 825 Eighth Avenue, One Worldwide Plaza
 322 West 57th Street, BMW
 1000 Tenth Avenue, St. Luke's Roosevelt Hospital Center
 200 West 60th Street, Concerto
 45 West 60th Street, Regent
 30 West 61st Street, Beaumont
 One Central Park West, Trump International Hotel and Tower
 1886 Broadway, 30 Lincoln Plaza
 One Lincoln Plaza
 75 West End Avenue
 2 Lincoln Square
 145 West 67th Street, Tower 67
 1991 Broadway, Bel Canto

Central Midtown
 108 Fifth Avenue
 5 East 22nd Street, Madison Green
 50 Lexington Avenue
 230 West 27th Street
 1 Pennsylvania Plaza, One Penn Plaza
 3 Park Avenue
 420 Fifth Avenue
 445 Fifth Avenue, Fifth Avenue Tower
 1411 Broadway, World Apparel Center
 1095 Avenue of the Americas
 120 Park Avenue, Philip Morris
 101 Park Avenue
 1114 Sixth Avenue, W. R. Grace Building
 1155 Sixth Avenue
 1535 Broadway, Marriott Marquis
 1185 Sixth Avenue, Stevens Tower
 1211 Avenue of the Americas
 1166 Sixth Avenue
 575 Fifth Avenue
 299 Park Avenue, Westvaco
 437 Madison Avenue
 12 East 49th Street, Tower 49
 611 Fifth Avenue
 1251 Sixth Avenue
 1221 Sixth Avenue, McGraw-Hill
 745 Seventh Avenue
 1633 Broadway, Paramount Plaza
 1285 Sixth Avenue, Paine Webber
 650 Fifth Avenue
 645 Fifth Avenue, Olympic Tower
 457 Madison Avenue, New York Palace Hotel
 40 East 52nd Street
 345 Park Avenue
 55 East 52nd Street
 520 Madison Avenue
 31 West 52nd Street, Deutsche Bank
 51 West 52nd Street, CBS
 810 Seventh Avenue
 1345 Avenue of the Americas
 1370 Avenue of the Americas
 712 Fifth Avenue
 550 Madison Avenue
 535 Madison Avenue, Warburg Dillon Read
 65 East 55th Street, Park Avenue Tower
 450 Park Avenue
 590 Madison Avenue
 725 Fifth Avenue, Trump Tower
 118 West 57th Street, Le Parker Meridien Hotel
 146 West 57th Street, Metropolitan Tower
 888 Seventh Avenue
 1755 Broadway, Symphony House
 9 West 57th Street, Solow
 767 Fifth Avenue, General Motors Building
 115 East 57th Street, Galleria
 135 East 57th Street
 499 Park Avenue

In addition, the following POPS are on 6½ Avenue between 51st and 57th Street:
 Axa Equitable Center
 Carnegie Hall Tower
 Le Parker Meridien
 Metropolitan Tower

East Midtown
 240 East 27th Street
 155 East 31st Street, Windsor Court
 200 East 32nd Street, Future
 243 Lexington Avenue
 401 East 34th Street, Rivergate
 626 First Avenue, American Copper Buildings
 630 First Avenue, Manhattan Place
 560 Third Avenue, Murray Hill Mews
 240 East 38th Street
 311 East 38th Street, Whitney
 330 East 38th Street, Corinthian
 250 East 40th Street, Highpoint
 222 East 39th Street, Eastgate Tower
 600 Third Avenue
 622 Third Avenue, Grand Central Plaza
 235 East 40th Street, Vanderbilt
 212 East 42nd Street, The Westin New York Grand Central Hotel
 425 Lexington Avenue	
 140 East 45th Street, Two Grand Central Tower 
 685 Third Avenue
 303 East 43rd Street, International Plaza
 3 United Nations Plaza, UNICEF House
 320 East 46th Street, Belmont	
 240 East 47th Street, Dag Hammarskjold Tower
 747 Third Avenue
 885 Second Avenue, 1 Dag Hammarskjold Plaza
 845 First Avenue, Trump World Tower
 100 United Nations Plaza/871 United Nations Plaza
 767 Third Avenue
 777 Third Avenue
 780 Third Avenue
 805 Third Avenue, Crystal Pavilion
 255 East 49th Street, Sterling Plaza
 153 East 53rd Street, Citigroup Center
 875 Third Avenue
 300 East 54th Street, Connaught Tower
 420 East 54th Street, River Tower
 415 East 54th Street, St. James Tower
 245 East 54th Street, Brevard
 360 East 57th Street, Morrison
 300 East 59th Street, Landmark
 425 East 58th Street, Sovereign
 418 East 59th Street, Grand Sutton

Upper East Side
 200 East 61st Street, Savoy
 303 East 60th Street, Evansview
 300 East 62nd Street, Paladin
 167 East 61st Street, Trump Plaza
 188 East 64th Street, Royale
 200 East 64th Street, Carlton Towers
 200 East 65th Street, Bristol
 304 East 65th Street, Rio
 200 East 69th Street, Trump Palace
 211 East 70th Street
 400 East 70th Street, Kingsley
 524 East 72nd Street, Belaire
 422 East 72nd Street, Oxford
 525 East 72nd Street, One East River Place
 300 East 75th Street, Fairmont
 515 East 79th Street, Austen House
 401 East 80th Street
 200 East 82nd Street, Wimbledon
 400 East 84th Street, Strathmore
 300 East 85th Street, America
 171 East 84th Street, Evans Tower
 455 East 86th Street, Channel Club
 201 East 87th Street
 50 East 89th Street, Park Regis
 200 East 89th Street, Monarch
 40 East 94th Street, Carnegie Hill Tower
 300 East 93rd Street, Waterford	
 340 East 93rd Street, Plymouth Tower
 301 East 94th Street, Marmara Manhattan
 235 East 95th Street, Normandie Court
 175 East 96th Street, Monterey

Brooklyn
Downtown
 350 Jay Street, Renaissance Plaza
 130 Livingston Street, Livingston Plaza
 1 MetroTech Center, Brooklyn Commons

Queens
Long Island City
 One Court Square

See also 
 List of New York City parks

References

External links 
 Privately Owned Public Space in New York City at Municipal Art Society of New York
 New York City's Privately Owned Public Spaces at New York City Department of City Planning
 Privately Owned Public Space: The New York City Experience Amazon.com

Public spaces
New York City
Geography of New York City

New York City